Terran or Terrans may also refer to:

Fictional entities

Literature 
 Terran Federation (Starship Troopers)
 Terran Trade Authority universe of Stewart Cowley
 Terran Empire in the books of Poul Anderson

Television 
 Terran Federation
 Terran Empire in the Mirror Universe of Star Trek

Gaming 
 Terran Empire, in Star Hero
 The Terran, in StarCraft
 Terran Federation (Starfire)
 Terran Republic, in PlanetSide
 Terrans, in Star Command: Revolution
 Terran Confederation (Wing Commander)
 Terrans, in the X video game series

People 
 Jennifer Terran (fl. from 1997), American singer-songwriter and pianist
 Tony Terran (1926–2017), American trumpet player and musician
 Terran Campbell (born 1998), Canadian soccer player
 Terran Petteway (born 1992), American basketball player in the Israeli Basketball Premier League
 Terran Sandwith (born 1972), Canadian ice hockey player

Other 
 Terran (grape), alternative name for Mondeuse Noire 
 Terran, the name of space launch vehicles by Relativity Space

See also 

 Terran Federation (disambiguation)
 Terra (disambiguation)
 Terrain (disambiguation)
 Terrestrial (disambiguation)
 Earth#Etymology
 Earth in science fiction#Related vocabulary
 Earthling (disambiguation)